Syllepte fabiusalis is a moth in the family Crambidae. It was described by Francis Walker in 1859. It is found on Borneo and in Zhejiang, China and the Philippines.

References

Moths described in 1859
fabiusalis
Moths of Asia